Arminius ( 18/17 BC – 21 AD) was a chieftain of the Germanic Cherusci tribe who is best known for commanding an alliance of Germanic tribes at the Battle of the Teutoburg Forest in 9 AD, in which three Roman legions under the command of general Publius Quinctilius Varus were destroyed. His victory at Teutoburg Forest would precipitate the Roman Empire's permanent strategic withdrawal from Germania Magna. Modern historians have regarded Arminius' victory as one of Rome's greatest defeats. As it prevented the Romanization of Germanic peoples east of the Rhine, it has also been considered one of the most decisive battles in history and a turning point in human history.

Born a prince of the Cherusci tribe, Arminius was part of the Roman friendly faction of the tribe. He learned Latin and served in the Roman military, which gained him Roman citizenship and the rank of eques. After serving with distinction in the Great Illyrian Revolt, he was sent to Germania to aid the local governor Publius Quinctilius Varus in completing the Roman conquest of the Germanic tribes. While in this capacity, Arminius secretly plotted a Germanic revolt against Roman rule, which culminated in the ambush and destruction of three Roman legions in the Teutoburg Forest.

In the aftermath of the battle, Arminius fought retaliatory invasions by the Roman general Germanicus in the battles of Pontes Longi, Idistaviso, and the Angrivarian Wall, and deposed a rival, the Marcomanni king Maroboduus. Germanic nobles, afraid of Arminius' growing power, assassinated him in 21 AD. He was remembered in Germanic legends for generations afterwards. The Roman historian Tacitus designated Arminius as the liberator of the Germanic tribes and commended him for having fought the Roman Empire to a standstill at the peak of its power.

During the unification of Germany in the 19th century, Arminius was hailed by German nationalists as a symbol of German unity and freedom. Following World War II, however, Arminius' significance was reduced in Germany due to his association with militaristic nationalism; the 2,000th anniversary of his victory at the Teutoburg Forest was only lightly commemorated in Germany.

Name
In his History, Marcus Velleius Paterculus mentions him as "Arminius, the son of Sigimer, a prince of the nation" and states he "attained the dignity of equestrian rank". Due to Roman naming conventions of the time, it is likely  is an adopted name granted to him upon citizenship or in any case not his Germanic name. According to another theory, that name was given to Arminius for his service in Armenia.

Hermann etymologically means "Man of War", coming from the Old High German  meaning "war" and  meaning "person" or "man".

Biography

Born in 18 or 17 BC in Germania, Arminius was the son of the Cheruscan chief Segimerus (German: Segimer; Proto-Germanic: Sigimariz; Old English: Sigemaer), who was allied with Rome.

Arminius learned to speak Latin and joined the Roman military alongside his younger brother Flavus. He served in the Roman army between 1 and 6 AD, and received a military education as well as Roman citizenship and the status of equite before returning to Germania. These experiences gave him knowledge of Roman politics and military tactics, which allowed him to successfully anticipate enemy battle maneuvers during his later campaigns against the Roman army.

Battle of the Teutoburg Forest

Around the year 4 AD, Arminius assumed command of a Cheruscan detachment of Roman auxiliary forces, probably while fighting in the Pannonian wars on the Balkan peninsula. He returned to northern Germania in 7 or 8 AD, where the Roman Empire had established secure control of the territories just east of the Rhine, along the Lippe and Main rivers, and was now seeking to extend its hegemony eastward to the Weser and Elbe rivers, under Publius Quinctilius Varus, a high-ranking administrative official appointed by Augustus as governor. Arminius began plotting to unite various Germanic tribes in order to thwart Roman efforts to incorporate their lands into the empire. This proved a difficult task, as the tribes were strongly independent and many were traditionally enemies of each other.

Between 6 and 9 AD, the Romans were forced to move eight of the eleven legions present in Germania east of the Rhine to crush a rebellion in the Balkans, leaving Varus with only three legions to face the Germans, which was still 18,000 troops, or 6,000 men per legion. An additional two legions, under the command of Lucius Nonius Asprenas, were stationed in Moguntiacum. Arminius saw this as the perfect opportunity to defeat Varus.

In the autumn of 9 AD, the 25-year-old Arminius brought to Varus a false report of rebellion in northern Germany. He persuaded Varus to divert the three legions under his command (composed of the 17th, 18th, and 19th legions, plus three cavalry detachments and six cohorts of auxiliaries), which were at the time marching to winter quarters, to suppress the rebellion. Varus and his legions marched right into the trap that Arminius had set for them near Kalkriese. Arminius' tribe, the Cherusci, and their allies the Marsi, Chatti, Bructeri, Chauci, and Sicambri (five out of at least fifty Germanic tribes at the time) ambushed and annihilated Varus' entire army, totaling over 20,000 men, as it marched along a narrow road through a dense forest. When defeat was certain, Varus committed suicide. The battle was one of the most devastating defeats Rome suffered in its history. Arminius' success in destroying three entire legions and driving the Romans out of Germany marked a high point of Germanic power for centuries. Roman attempts to reconquer Germania failed, although they did eventually manage to break Arminius' carefully coordinated alliance.

Roman retaliation, inter-tribal conflicts, and death

After the battle, the Germans quickly annihilated every trace of Roman presence east of the Rhine. Roman settlements such as the Waldgirmes Forum were abandoned. The vastly outnumbered Roman garrison of Aliso (present-day Haltern am See), under the command of the prefect Lucius Cedicius, inflicted heavy losses on the Germans before retreating into Gaul, resisting long enough for Lucius Nonius Asprenas to organize the Roman defense on the Rhine and Tiberius to arrive with a new army. This prevented Arminius from crossing the Rhine and invading Gaul.

Between 14 and 16 AD, Germanicus led punitive operations into Germany, fighting Arminius to a draw in the Battle at Pontes Longi and twice defeating him (according to Tacitus): first in the Battle of Idistaviso and later at the Battle of the Angrivarian Wall. In 15 AD, Roman troops managed to recapture one of the three legionary eagles lost in the Battle of the Teutoburg Forest. In 16 AD, a second eagle was retrieved. Tiberius denied the request of Germanicus to launch an additional campaign for 17 AD, however, having decided the frontier with Germania would stand at the Rhine river. Instead, he offered Germanicus the honor of a triumph for his two victories. The third Roman eagle was recovered in 41 AD by Publius Gabinius, under the emperor Claudius. Arminius also faced opposition from his father-in-law and other pro-Roman Germanic leaders. His brother Flavus, who had been raised alongside him in Rome, remained loyal to the Roman Empire and fought under Germanicus against Arminius at the Battle of Idistaviso. With the end of the Roman threat, a war broke out between Arminius and Marbod, king of the Marcomanni. It ended with Marbod fleeing to Ravenna and Roman protection, but Arminius failed to break into the "natural fortification" of Bohemia, and the war ended in stalemate.

In 19 AD, Germanicus died in Antioch under circumstances which led many to believe he had been poisoned by his opponents. Arminius died two years later, in 21 AD, murdered by opponents within his own tribe who felt that he was becoming too powerful. Tiberius allegedly had refused an earlier offer from a Chatti nobleman to poison Arminius: "It was not by secret treachery but openly and by arms that the people of Rome avenged themselves on their enemies."

Marriage to Thusnelda 
Arminius married a Germanic princess named Thusnelda. Her father was the Cheruscan prince Segestes, who was pro-Roman. After the Battle of the Teutoburg Forest, Arminius abducted and then impregnated Thusnelda circa 14 AD. This elopement was likely a result of a dispute between Arminius and Segestes who was against their relationship. In May 15 AD the Roman general Germanicus captured Thusnelda. At the point of her capture she was pregnant and living with her father, who had taken her back. Arminius deeply grieved the capture of Thusnelda and did not marry again. Tacitus recorded that Arminius was "driven to frenzy" by the loss of his beloved wife. Tacitus states in the Annals:Arminius, with his naturally furious temper, was driven to frenzy by the seizure of his wife and the foredooming to slavery of his wife's unborn child. He flew hither and thither among the Cherusci, demanding "war against Segestes, war against Cæsar." And he refrained not from taunts.Thusnelda gave birth to a son named Thumelicus who grew up in Roman captivity. Tacitus describes him as having an unusual story, which he promises to tell in his later writings, but these writings have never been found.

Legacy
Arminius' victory against the Roman legions in the Teutoburg Forest had a far-reaching effect on the subsequent history of both the ancient Germanic peoples and on the Roman Empire. The Romans made no further concerted efforts to conquer and permanently hold Germania beyond the Rhine and the Agri Decumates. Numerous modern historians have regarded Arminius' victory as one of the most decisive battles in history, with some calling it "Rome's greatest defeat".

Rome

In the accounts of his Roman enemies, Arminius is highly regarded for his military leadership and as a defender of the liberty of his people. Based on these records, the story of Arminius was revived in the 16th century with the recovery of the histories of Tacitus, who wrote in his Annales II, 88:

Arminius was not the only reason for Rome's change of policy towards Germania. Politics also played a factor; emperors found they could rarely trust a large army to a potential rival, though Augustus had enough loyal family members to wage his wars. Also, Augustus, in his 40-year reign, had annexed many territories still at the beginning of the process of Romanization. Tiberius, who succeeded Augustus in 14 AD, decided that Germania was a far less developed land, possessing few villages and only a small food surplus, and therefore was not currently important to Rome. Conquering Germania would require a commitment too burdensome for the imperial finances and an excessive expenditure of military force.

Modern scholars have pointed out that the Rhine was a more practical boundary for the Roman Empire than any other river in Germania. Armies on the Rhine could be supplied from the Mediterranean Sea via the Rhône, Saône, and Mosel, with only a brief area of portage. Armies on the Elbe, however, would had to have been supplied by extensive overland routes or by ships travelling the hazardous Atlantic. Economically, the Rhine already had towns and sizable villages at the time of the Gallic conquest. The Rhine was significantly more accessible from Rome and better equipped to supply sizable garrisons than the regions beyond.

Rome chose no longer to rule directly in Germania east of the Rhine and north of the Danube, instead preferring to exert indirect influence by appointing client kings, which was cheaper than military campaigns. Italicus, nephew of Arminius, was appointed king of the Cherusci; Vangio and Sido became vassal princes of the powerful Suebi, etc. When indirect methods proved insufficient to control the Germanic tribes beyond the Rhine, Roman emperors occasionally led devastating punitive campaigns deep into Germania. One of them, led by the Roman emperor Maximinus Thrax, resulted in a Roman victory in 235 at the Battle at the Harzhorn Hill, located in the modern German state of Lower Saxony, east of the Weser river, between the towns of Kalefeld and Bad Gandersheim.

Old Germanic sagas
In the early 19th century, attempts were made to show that the story of Arminius and his victory may have lived on in the Old Norse sagas, in the form of the dragon slayer Sigurd of the Völsunga saga and the Nibelungenlied. An Icelandic account states that Sigurd "slew the dragon" in the Gnitaheidr—today the suburb Knetterheide of the city of Bad Salzuflen, located at a strategic site on the Werre river which could very well have been the point of departure of Varus' legions on their way to their doom in the Teutoburg Forest. One of the foremost Scandinavian scholars of the 19th century, Guðbrandur Vigfússon, identified Sigurd as Arminius. This educated guess was also picked up by Otto Höfler, who was a prominent Nazi academic during World War II.

German nationalism
During the unification of Germany in the 19th century, Arminius was hailed as a symbol of German unity and freedom. In Germany, the name Arminius was interpreted as reflecting the name Hermann by Martin Luther, who saw Arminius as a symbol of the German people and their fight against Rome. Hermann der Cheruskerfürst became an emblem of the revival of German nationalism fueled by the Napoleonic Wars in the 19th century, such as in Caspar David Friedrich's 1812 painting The Tombs of the Old Heroes.

In 1808, Heinrich von Kleist wrote the play Die Hermannsschlacht, but with Napoleon's victory at Wagram it remained in manuscript, being published in 1821 and not staged until 1860. The play has been revived repeatedly at moments propitious for raw expressions of National Romanticism and was especially popular in Nazi Germany.

In 1838, construction was started on a massive statue of Arminius, known as the Hermannsdenkmal, on a hill near Detmold in the Teutoburg Forest; it was finally completed and dedicated during the early years of the Second German Empire in the wake of the German victory over France in the Franco-Prussian War of 1870–1871. The monument has been a major tourist attraction ever since, as has the Hermann Heights Monument, a similar statue erected in New Ulm, Minnesota, in the United States in 1897. The Hermann Heights monument was erected by the Sons of Hermann, a fraternal organization formed by German Americans in New York City in 1840 that flourished during the 19th century in American cities with large populations of German origin. Hermann, Missouri, a town on the Missouri River founded in the 1830s and incorporated in 1845, was also named for Arminius.

Following the rise of Nazi Germany, fueled by aggressive German nationalism, and its subsequent defeat in World War II, Arminius became a lesser-known figure among West Germans and many schools shied away from teaching his story in any detail due to its previous association with nationalism. There was, however, a somewhat different perception in East Germany. In East Germany, Arminius, based on a Marxist reading of history, came to be seen as a revolutionary figure of sorts, leading German tribes in a fight against the Roman slaveholder society (Sklavenhaltergesellschaft). In the context of the Cold War, Arminius was interpreted as symbolic of socialism, with Rome being a symbol of the capitalist United States as an oppressive empire.

According to journalist David Crossland: "The old nationalism has been replaced by an easy-going patriotism that mainly manifests itself at sporting events like the soccer World Cup." The German Bundesliga football club DSC Arminia Bielefeld is named after Arminius. The 2,000-year anniversary of the battle was also celebrated in New Ulm, Minnesota without restraint. There were mock battles between Romans and club-wielding barbarians and also a lecture series in an auditorium.

Cultural references
 Arminio is a 1692 opera about Arminius by the Bohemian-Austrian composer Heinrich Ignaz Franz Biber.
 Arminio is a 1736 opera about Arminius by George Frideric Handel.
 Arminius is an 1877 oratorio about Arminius by the German composer Max Bruch.
 Barbarians is a 2020 TV show that features a fictionalized version of Arminius as one of the central characters.

See also

 Ariovistus
 Bato the Breucian
 Bato the Daesitiate
 Boudica
 Divico
 Gaius Julius Civilis
 Teutobod
 Vercingetorix

Citations

Sources 
 
 
 
 Dörner, Andreas, Politischer Mythos und symbolische Politik. Der Hermannmythos: Zur Entstehung des Nationalbewußtseins der Deutschen (Reinbek: Rowohlt, 1996).
 
 von Essen, Gesa, Hermannsschlachten. Germanen- und Römerbilder in der Literatur des 18. und 19. Jahrhunderts (Göttingen: Wallstein, 1998).
 Kuehnemund, Richard, Arminius or the Rise of a National Symbol in Literature: From Hutten to Grabbe (New York: AMS Press, 1966).
 Münkler Herfried, and Hans Grünberger: "Arminius/ Hermann als nationales Symbol im Diskurs der deutschen Humanisten 1500–1570", In: Herfried Münkler, Hans Grünberger, and Kathrin Mayer, Nationenbildung. Die Nationalisierung Europas im Diskurs humanistischer Intellektueller. Italien und Deutschland (Berlin: Akademie, 1998), pp. 263–308.
 
 
 Wagner-Egelhaaf, Martina (ed.), Hermanns Schlachten. Zur Literaturgeschichte eines nationalen Mythos (Bielefeld: Aisthesis, 2008).
 
 Wolters, Reinhard Die Schlacht im Teutoburger Wald: Arminius, Varus und das roemische Germanien (München: Verlag C. H. Beck, 2008).

External links

 Arminius at the Encyclopædia Britannica
 Arminius at the Ancient History Encyclopedia
 "Arminius / Varus: Die Varusschlacht im Jahre 9 n. Chr." – LWL-Institut für westfälische Regionalgeschichte (in German)
 "Terry Jones' Barbarians: The Savage Goths" – includes a portion on Arminius
 A description of Arminius and his fight against the Romans (in German)
 "They Need a Hero" by Clay Risen in The National, October 9, 2009 – article on modern German views of Hermann and the 2,000th anniversary of the battle

 
010s BC births
1st-century rulers in Europe
021 deaths
Ancient Roman soldiers
Cherusci rulers
Cherusci warriors